Qomoqomong is a community council located in the Quthing District of Lesotho. Its population in 2006 was 6,760.

Villages
The community of Qomoqomong includes the villages of Basieng, Basieng (Khoaba-la-eja-Papa), Basieng (Mafikeng), Basieng (Phuthalichaba), Ha Bulara (Qomoqomong), Ha Elia, Ha Kompi, Ha Lephutha (Qomoqomong), Ha Liphophi, Ha Litau, Ha Malaela, Ha Mochotoane, Ha Mojakhomo, Ha Mokhameleli (Qomoqomong), Ha Molebaliso, Ha Moorosi, Ha Moshe, Ha Phera, Ha Ramosoeu (Qomoqomong), Ha Ratšiu (Qomoqomong), Ha Setoko, Ha Setoko (Khohlong), Ha Tameisi, Ha Tsikane, Khohlong (Ha Molebaliso), Lebenkeleng (Qomoqomong), Liqala, Mabuleng, Maheising, Makhetheng, Maphepheng, Matebeleng, Moorosi Flats, Phuthing, Sekhutlong (Ha Phoka), Sekolong (Qomoqomong), Thoteng and Thoteng (Qomoqomong).

References

External links
 Google map of community villages

Populated places in Quthing District